The 1973 Dallas Cowboys season was their 14th in the league. The team matched their previous output of 10–4. They qualified for the playoffs for the eighth straight season. After a 4-3 start the Cowboys won six of their last seven games to win the NFC East with a solid 10-4 record. In the Divisional Playoffs the Cowboys beat the Los Angeles Rams 27-16 in Texas Stadium to earn their fourth straight Championship Game Appearance. However, not even the home crowd at Texas Stadium could help the Cowboys as they fell to the Minnesota Vikings 27-10.

NFL Draft

Schedule

Division opponents are in bold text

Standings

Season summary

Week 1 at Bears

Week 2

Week 3

Week 4

Week 10

Playoffs

Roster

Publications
The Football Encyclopedia 
Total Football 
Cowboys Have Always Been My Heroes

References

External links
 1973 Dallas Cowboys
 Pro Football Hall of Fame
 Dallas Cowboys Official Site

Dallas Cowboys seasons
NFC East championship seasons
Dallas Cowboys
Dallas Cowboys